The Gathering (abbreviated as "TG" for short) is the second largest computer party in the world (second to DreamHack). It is held annually in Vikingskipet Olympic Arena in Hamar, Norway, and lasts for five consecutive days (starting on the Wednesday in Easter each year). Each year, TG attracts more than 5200 (mostly young) people, with attendance increasing every year. As of April 2012, The Gathering holds the World Record for fastest Internet connection at 200 Gbits per second.

History

Beginning
In early 1991, Vegard Skjefstad and Trond Michelsen, members of the demogroup Deadline, decided that they wanted to organize a big demoparty in Norway. In the late eighties/early nineties, it was common that demoparties (more commonly called "copyparties" at this time) were organized by large demogroups. Because of this, and the fact that Deadline wasn't particularly well known, Mr. Skjefstad suggested that the group Crusaders should be involved. At this time, The Crusaders was one of Norway's most popular Amiga groups. Partly because of their music disks, but also because of their diskmag, the Crusaders Eurochart. At first, Crusaders weren't too keen on the idea of organizing a party, but when Mr. Skjefstad reminded them about the fact that they always complained about the other parties of the same sort, and that this was their chance to show everyone how it should be done, which caused the Crusaders to agree.

After briefly considering having the party during the fall of 1991, it was decided that Easter would be better. All schools are closed during Easter week and the period from Maundy Thursday to Easter Monday are official holidays in Norway. This meant that most of the target audience would have time off to attend TG, and all organizers and crew could work full-time with TG with a minimum usage of vacation days.

1992–1995
In 1992, 1100 people gathered in Skedsmohallen at Lillestrøm, way more than the expected count of about 800.  The following years, TG continued to grow. In 1993 Skedsmohallen again was the venue with 1400 people visiting the party. This was more than the capacity of the venue, making it clear that a bigger venue was required. In 1994 the venue was Rykkinnhallen in Bærum, and the visitor count had risen to 1800 - again more than the venue could hold, which led to intervention by the local fire department who banned indoor sleeping. Consequently, the organizers had to hire a large construction tent and some heavy duty heating equipment (there was still snow on the ground).

No bigger venue could be found and this may have been one reason why Skjefstad and The Crusaders declined to arrange the party in 1995. A group from Stavanger led by Magnar Harestad proposed to host the party instead, and got approval and some backing from the TG crew. They hired Stavanger Ishall, "Siddishallen" and the party was renamed "Gathering 95". However, this caused a sharp drop in attendance, barely 500 people attended, not even filling the hall to half capacity. This may have been due to moving the event away from the Eastern, more densely populated part of Norway - while the previous events had been held well within one hours drive from the capital of Oslo, Stavanger is over 470 km from Oslo, taking more than 7 hours to drive.

1996-current
Meanwhile, the venues built for the 1994 Winter Olympics were made available for hire, and prices were increasingly reasonable due to lack of interest. Amongst these were the Vikingskipet ice skating arena in Hamar, at the time Norway's largest indoor arena - located  hours' drive from central Oslo, and with good infrastructure (power, parking etc.). Skjefstad and The Crusaders decided to rent it and have another go, and The Gathering 1996, attracted around 2500 visitors.

The organizers then decided to create a separate organization, KANDU (Kreativ, Aktiv Norsk Dataungdom - 'Creative, Active Norwegian Computer Youth') for the specific purpose of running TG every year, and thus promote creativity and computer literacy.

Since then The Gathering continued to grow. By 1998 the maximum capacity of Vikingskipet, of about 5200 attendees, were reached. KANDU have not, however, decided to switch venues again although even larger venues such as the Telenor Arena at Fornebu outside of Oslo are now available. Instead, tickets for the event have sold out increasingly quickly. 
During Getering 2016, a concert of electronic music was performed on stage by Sabastian Teir alias "Kebu".

The Gathering 2020 was cancelled after recommendations by local health authorities due to the COVID-19 pandemic. Instead, it was to be arranged online under the hashtag TG:Online.

Daily life

TG lasts for five days (from Holy Wednesday to Easter Sunday every year), and is both longer and bigger than most other computer parties. Most people tend to let their daily rhythm go and instead sleep as they see fit (many simply in front of their computer, but most people on the arena stands); for a lot of people most of the time is usually spent in front of a computer, but many like to use the opportunity to meet new or old friends in real life.

People have wildly different opinions about what constitutes a proper LAN party; the common trend at TG these years seem to be warez, games (the most popular being Counter-Strike), and IRC. However, many visitors find this too boring in the long run, and there are many unofficial mini-events happening all the time. Informal competitions to build the highest tower of soda cans are not uncommon, and people have been spotted having their own private mini-rave-parties put together by a few people and a PC with PA Systems.

Happenings and the demoscene
TG has always been a hub for young creative people to battle it out in many types of competitions; demo coding, music, graphics, animation, games, hardware-modification and Dance Dance Revolution to name a few; in addition, there are usually concerts and other things happening live on stage once or twice a day, as well as seminars etc.

In the first years, the focus on TG was pretty much on demos, but as TG is held at the same time as Breakpoint, a German scene-only party (and the earlier Mekka & Symposium), many European demosceners have left TG in favour of BP, and TG, like the majority of other computer parties, has become more of a gamer event. The scene at TG still lives on, though, as TG has introduced features such as a demoscene-only area, "creative cashback" (those handing in entries to the creative competitions get a discount) and other demo-oriented events. In fact, you have to go back as far as 1996 to match the number of entries handed in to the creative competitions at TG04.

Crew
The organization Kreativ Aktiv Norsk Dataungdom (KANDU) is formally responsible for hosting TG. In addition, there are around 500 volunteers participating to make TG possible every year; these are collectively called the crew.

The TG crew is split into multiple sub-crews, such as a democrew (Event:Demo), a gamecrew (Event:Game), a first-aid crew (Security:Medic), a network crew (Tech:Net), a server crew (Tech:Server), as well as a logistics crew (Core:Logistikk) etc.. (The exact list varies somewhat from year to year.) Each of these has a chief who reports upwards, and is responsible for some aspect of the party.

All crew members are volunteers and unpaid; the only advantages a crew member has over a normal visitor are free entrance, access to a crew-only sleeping room and hot food served a few times a day. All members of the crew must arrive at the party place one day before the party itself starts, and stay one day after the party to aid in cleaning up afterwards. (Some people, such as chiefs, typically come even sooner.)

Everybody who wants can become crew (except for the Security and logistics crews, where there is a minimum age of 18), by applying at a special interface called wannabe. The chiefs usually pick their own crew, based on the applications coming in and previous experience. Crew members from earlier years must re-apply every year if they want to be crew again, but it is rare for a person having done a good job not to be selected the next year.

Ticket sale controversy
Up to and including TG01, TG tickets (as all other tickets to everything else happening in Vikingskipet) were sold by Billettservice, a company closely related to the postal service in Norway. Partly sold via the Internet, partly by phone (but always picked up at a local post office), the Billettservice system broke down hard every year as thousands of people tried to order tickets to the event simultaneously.

To try to make the ticket sales a bit more smooth, a group of people closely related to the administration of TG made a separate company called Partyticket (or Partyticket.net, PTN for short), selling unified ticket-related services (such as ordering, payment, seating, handling competitions etc.) to smaller and larger computer parties. Partyticket went online for the first time in 2002, and like Billettservice instantly went down under the massive load, partly due to a problem at the third-party service authorizing credit card transactions. However, the tickets were still sold out in a matter of hours.

2003 was not much better; a lot of problems had been fixed (and PTN had successfully managed the ticket sales for several other computer parties), but there were still problems left, and it was decided to postpone the ticket sales by one day to fix the problems that had been discovered. The sales went relatively smooth the next day.

In 2004, one hoped that one would finally see the end of the problems, especially as a new queuing system and new hardware was installed; however, the server again buckled under the enormous load, and the queueing system was found to be severely buggy, apparently shuffling people around in the queue at random. This frustrated a lot of visitors, many of which never got tickets at all. Many people blame the ticket-sales problems directly at PTN and has tried to pressure TG into choosing some other solution.

In 2005 the queuing system was changed. Instead of buying actual tickets, people were put in a virtual queue, thus loading the server a lot less during the peak hours. The next day, people were processed from the start of the queue (but no more than 200 at a time). This system ended up working a lot better than the queueing system from 2004, despite some misconceptions in the media.

Since 2006, however, there have been no major issues.

In 2007 the Norwegian Tax Authority demanded that taxes were to be paid for the tickets sold from 2001 to 2008, as it did not consider The Gathering to be a cultural event (all cultural events in Norway are exempt from paying taxes). Although the management of TG sent a complaint to the Tax Authority, it did not reconsider the demands. By August 8, the management of TG was required to pay 988,536 NOK in unpaid taxes, which could have caused the 2009 staging of The Gathering to be cancelled. If no money was paid by the August 8 deadline, the event could have been closed for good. However, on August 16, 2008, KANDU and The Gathering won the tax case and will temporarily be exempted from paying taxes for the tickets sold in 2006, 2007, 2008 and the future. Also, the law will be amended to secure this for all other computer parties in Norway. The stated reason for this decision is that The Gathering's purpose is to gather youth from inland and abroad so these can get together to cultivate a computer culture, and the Storting has declared in a white paper that computer gaming is considered culture.

For The Gathering 2011 KANDU has signed an agreement for ticket sales with a company called Unicornis and their ticket system Geekevents. This agreement was for a three years period.

KANDU has signed a new contract with Geekevents AS, for a four-year period.

Name
Most years, TG has a name or "tagline"; the tagline doesn't really mean much, but it still influences the logo (or the other way round) and some other material. A list of names includes:

Demo and intro competition winners

References

  Tasajarvi, Lassi (2004).  Demoscene: The Art of Real-time.  Even Lake Studios.  .  pages 45–54.

External links

 The Gathering official website
 KANDU website
 The Gathering on Pouët
 The Gathering: Computer Parties as Means for Gender Inclusion by Hege Nordli, an academic paper about The Gathering demo party and parties in general. (PDF)
 Various logos
 
 

Demo parties
LAN parties
Festivals in Norway
Culture in Hedmark
Recurring events established in 1992
1992 establishments in Norway
Spring (season) events in Norway